New star or New Star may refer to:

Arts
New Star Music, a Romanian music group
Golden Globe Award for New Star of the Year – Actor, one of the Golden Globe Awards
Golden Globe Award for New Star of the Year - Actress, one of the Golden Globe Awards
"New Star", a song by Tears for Fears

Others
Star formation, a process of in which new stars are formed
Henderson New Star, formerly New Star Asset Management, management of funds
New Star BBC, a Burundian basketball club 
New Star Games, an independent video game developer
New Star Soccer, a video game series developed by New Star Games
New Star incident, a February 2009 incident in which the Chinese-owned cargo ship New Star was sunk by Russian coast guard in Sea of Japan

See also
Nova, short for "nova aster" or "new star", when a new "star" appears in the heavens of the Middle Ages, were referred to as "novae"